Ý Lan is a Vietnamese-American female singer. Her full name is Lê Thị Ý Lan. She was born on January 1, 1958, in Saigon, in an artistic-traditioned family. Her mother was the singer Thái Thanh, and her father is actor Lê Quỳnh.

Ý Lan attended primary and secondary school in Saigon. Despite her family's artistic tradition, she entered the professional music industry quite late: it was not until the late 1980s that she became a professional singer and released her first musical CD.

Ý Lan currently lives in California (United States).

Discography

Overseas
 DVD The Best of Ý Lan from Paris By Night (Thúy Nga, 2010)
 DVD The Best of MTV Music Vũ Khanh - Ý Lan (Diễm xưa, 2004)
 CD Hát Để Cho Đời - with Quang Tuấn (Ý Lan Productions, 2008)
 CD Tình Ca Phạm Duy - Đừng Lay Tôi Nhé Cuộc Đời (Ý Lan Productions, 2007)
 CD Hỏi Tình (Ý Lan Productions, 2006)
 CD Muốn Hỏi Tại Sao (Ý Lan Productions, 2006)
 CD Tình Ca Lam Phương - Tình Ca Không Đoạn Kết (Ý Lan Productions, 2004)
 CD Lời Rêu (Thúy Nga, 2004)
 CD Một Ngày Như Mọi Ngày (Ý Lan Productions, 2003)
 CD Tình Ca Đức Huy - Ru Em Tiếc Nuối (Ý Lan Productions, 2002)
 CD Em Còn Nhớ Hay Em Đã Quên - với Lan Anh (Ý Lan Productions, 2001)
 CD Khi Tôi Về (Ý Lan Productions, 2000)
 CD Mê Khúc (Ý Lan Productions, 2000)
 CD Ru Từng Nỗi Nhớ (Ý Lan Productions, 2000)
 CD Yêu, La Vie En Rose (Ý Lan Productions, 2000)

In Vietnam
 CD Tuyệt Tình (2013)
 CD Vẫn Có Anh Bên Đời (2013)
 CD Cô Bắc Kỳ Nho Nhỏ (2013)
 CD Một Mình (2013)
 CD Như Đã Dấu Yêu (2013)

References

External links
 Vmdb:  

20th-century Vietnamese women singers
1958 births
Living people
People from Ho Chi Minh City
Vietnamese emigrants to the United States
21st-century Vietnamese women singers
Vietnamese Buddhists